The  is a museum located in Sakae, Nagoya, the center of Nagoya City, in central Japan.

The museum houses one of the largest planetarium in the world and has three main sections on modern technology, life sciences and general science with a variety of hands-on exhibits. In 2012 much of the museum was renovated to coincide with the opening of the Planetarium. The upper floor of the museum is currently devoted to a display about space and future technology, utilizing touch-screen tablets and other technology.  Many of the exhibits have been specifically tailored for children, such as a model railway on the third floor in the transport section.

The museum also has features on the local Chubu region's links to science and industry.

It is located in Shirakawa Koen along with Nagoya City Art Museum, midway between Osu Kannon and Fushimi subway stations, on Fushimi-Dori.

External links 

Museums in Nagoya
Science museums in Japan
Planetaria in Japan
Sakae, Nagoya